Inch by Inch may refer to:

 Inch by Inch (film), 1985 gay pornographic video
 Inch by Inch, book by Leo Lionni
 Inch by Inch: 45 Haiku by Issa, anthology book of Buddhism-related poems, translated by Nanao Sakaki

Music 
 Inch by Inch, album by Sandra Beech

Songs
 "Inch by Inch", song by The Strikers (funk band)
 "Inch by Inch", song by The Plimsouls from Everywhere at Once
 "Inch by Inch", song by Elvis Costello from Goodbye Cruel World (album)
 "Inch by Inch", song by Hugh Dillon Redemption Choir from album The High Co$t of Low Living
 "Inch by Inch", song by Calexico from Aerocalexico
 "Inch by Inch", song by mathcore band Botch originally from The John Birch Conspiracy Theory, featured in compilation album The Unifying Themes of Sex, Death and Religion
 "Inch by Inch", song by French band Club Sandwich, whose music video was directed by Loic Maes

See also 
 Lines per inch (LPI), measurement of printing resolution in systems that use a halftone screen